The 1970–71 Gonzaga Bulldogs men's basketball team represented Gonzaga University during the 1970–71 NCAA University Division basketball season. Charter members of the recently expanded Big Sky Conference, the Bulldogs were led by twentieth-year head coach Hank Anderson and played their home games on campus at Kennedy Pavilion in Spokane, Washington.

No Bulldogs were selected for the all-conference team; senior center Bill Quigg was on the second team.

References

External links
Sports Reference – Gonzaga Bulldogs: 1970–71 basketball season

Gonzaga Bulldogs men's basketball seasons
Gonzaga